Almalu Rural District is in Nazarkahrizi District of Hashtrud County, East Azerbaijan province, Iran. At the National Census of 2006, its population was 6,561 in 1,171 households. There were 5,635 inhabitants in 1,515 households at the following census of 2011. At the most recent census of 2016, the population of the rural district was 5,445 in 1,597 households. The largest of its 38 villages was Basit, with 599 people.

References 

Hashtrud County

Rural Districts of East Azerbaijan Province

Populated places in East Azerbaijan Province

Populated places in Hashtrud County